Lokot may refer to:

 Lokot (inhabited locality), name of several inhabited localities in Russia
 Lokot, Bryansk Oblast
 Lokot, Loktevsky District, Altai Krai
 Lokot Autonomy (1942–1943), a semi-autonomous region in Nazi German-occupied Russia
 Anatoly Lokot (born 1959), mayor of Novosibirsk, Russia

See also
 Lokot-lokot, a Filipino delicacy made from rice
 Lokotok
 Lukut, a suburb of Port Dickson, Negeri Sembilan, Malaysia